Hello My Name Is may refer to:

"Hello, My Name Is" (song), contemporary Christian song by Matthew West
Hello My Name Is..., a 2012 album by Bridgit Mendler
Hello My Name Is, a 2011 album by Angelspit
hellomynameis, a hashtag popularized by Kate Granger
"Hello my name is" stickers, a type of name tag